The Northeastern Huskies represented Northeastern University in the Women's Hockey East Association during the 2019–20 NCAA Division I women's ice hockey season. The Huskies defeated the Connecticut Huskies to win the Hockey East postseason tournament. Qualifying for the 2020 NCAA National Collegiate Women's Ice Hockey Tournament, the Huskies were scheduled to compete against the Princeton Tigers in the Quarterfinals, but the event was cancelled due to the COVID-19 pandemic.

Offseason

Recruiting

Roster

2019-20 Huskies

Schedule
Source: 

|-
!colspan=12 style="  "| Regular Season
|-

Awards and honors
Aerin Frankel, Hockey Commissioners Association Women's Goaltender of the Month, November 2019
Aerin Frankel, 2020 First Team All-American 
Katy Knoll, Women’s Hockey Commissioners’ Association National Rookie of the Month, November 2019

References

Northeastern Huskies
Northeastern Huskies women's ice hockey seasons
Northeastern
Northeastern
Northeastern